Clovia is a women's sorority founded at Kansas State University in 1931.

History
In 1930, a group of former 4-H members, women who had enrolled at the school now known as Kansas State University, met often for friendship and the continuation of relationships they shared from their years in the agricultural club. The following summer, in 1931, plans began in earnest to create an organization for themselves and similar collegians who had a 4-H affinity with the aim of teaching cooperative living and to provide mutual support. The founders were: 

Mary Jordan Regnier, an Alpha chapter founder was the designer of the Clovia Crest and the official pin.  The name, Clovia, was a suggestion from a Kansas State professor of the Greek language. Clovia is a Greek word for the clover plant.

The sorority expanded slowly with the addition of a similarly themed local chapter at the University of Minnesota, called Sigma Phi Eta, joining in 1937.  In 1939 this chapter formalized a name change by becoming the Beta chapter of Clovia, with its parent chapter adopting the name of Alpha chapter. Scattered yearbook references note that the national 4-H Foundation was involved in coordinating formation of chapters.  Four additional chapters have been formed in the decades since that start. 

The cooperative nature of the sorority appears to have distinguished it from other Greek Letter Organizations, where several chapters identified their reason for formation being that their low-cost, cooperative model was cheaper than competing dorms, general sororities or other living arrangements.  Today, the Alpha of Clovia chapter operates as a co-op. Rather than a social sorority, Clovia calls itself a "Service and Social" organization.

From the beginning, Clovia's Mission was established with the following four Principles:

To bind together all our members in a sincere and enduring sisterhood and to promote a spirit of sociability and good fellowship among the 4-H women students at Kansas State University
To bring out the best qualities in one another through precept, example, and friendly criticism
To lend one another every honorable means of assistance and encouragement throughout life
To provide happy, adequate and economical living conditions for all our members

Headquarters
As there are two surviving chapters, both stable; each managing its own affairs directly with a shared history.  Its two chapter homes are owned by alumni associations.  Occasional meetings are held on a rotating basis.

In 2016, the Alpha of Clovia chapter revised its constitution to operate as a 4-H themed cooperative house.  The Beta of Clovia chapter has a more visible sorority program, although it does not caucus with the campus Panhellenic.  But it presents multiple events each year in conjunction with the nearby fraternities and sororities present on the St. Paul, or Agricultural campus of the University of Minnesota.

Philanthropy
Both chapters of Clovia support local philanthropies, including the 4-H and the National FFA Organization (FFA).

Alumnae Society
The surviving chapters have active alumni associations.  Every year they organize a Clovia Marketplace to sell handmade craft items for the benefit of scholarships.

Chapters
Six chapters of Clovia were formed.  As a naming convention, chapters were consistently referenced by both their chapter designation and the name of the national organization, thus Alpha of Clovia, Beta of Clovia, Gamma of Clovia, etc. Two chapters remain active.  Active chapters are noted in bold, inactive chapters are in italic.

References

External links

Student organizations established in 1931
1931 establishments in Kansas
Fraternities and sororities in the United States
4-H